In coachbuilding, a landau is a four-wheeled carriage with a roof that can be let down. It was a luxury carriage. The low shell of the landau provides maximal visibility of the occupants and their clothing, a feature that makes a landau still a popular choice for Lord Mayors in the United Kingdom on ceremonial occasions.

History of landau carriages

A landau is lightweight and suspended on elliptical springs. It was invented in the 18th century; landau in this sense is first noted in English in 1743. It was named after the German city of Landau in the Rhenish Palatinate where they were first produced.  In the 1830s, Luke Hopkinson, a celebrated coach-maker in Holborn, introduced the Briska Landau, which led with subsequent improvements to the popular landau.

Description and development

A landau, drawn by a pair or four-in-hand, is one of several kinds of vis-à-vis, a social carriage with facing seats over a dropped footwell (illustration), which was perfected by the mid-19th century in the form of a swept base that flowed in a single curve. The soft folding top is divided into two sections, front and rear, latched at the center. These usually lie perfectly flat, but the back section can be let down or thrown back while the front section can be removed or left stationary. When fully opened, the top can completely cover the passengers, with some loss of the graceful line.

The landau's center section might contain a fixed full-height glazed door, or more usually a low half-door. There would usually be a separate raised open coachman's upholstered bench-seat, but a landau could be postilion-driven, and there was usually a separate groom's seat, sprung above and behind the rear axle, saving the groom from having to stand on a running board.

A five-glass landau was fitted with a front glass windscreen and two windows on each side (including retractable windows on the doors).

The landau reached its full development by the mid-19th century. It was purely a city carriage of luxury type. The low shell of the landau made for maximum visibility of the occupants and their clothing, a feature that makes a landau still a popular choice for Lords Mayor on ceremonial occasions.

Landaulet 

A landaulet carriage is a cut-down (coupé) version of a landau carriage. The landaulet retained the rear half of the landau's two-part folding top.

Royal use in Britain 

The Royal Mews contains several different types of landau: seven State Landaus are in regular use (dating from between 1838 & 1872), plus five Semi-state Landaus. As well as being slightly plainer in ornamentation, the Semi-state Landaus are distinguished from the State Landaus in that they are postilion-driven, rather than driven from the box. 

The 1902 State Landau was built for the coronation of Edward VII in 1902. Unlike the earlier State Landaus, it is postilion-driven. So too are the five Ascot Landaus, smaller and lighter carriages with basket-work sides, which are used each year (as their name suggests) at Royal Ascot. The Royal Mews also retains a miniature landau made for the children of George V and designed to be pulled by ponies.

Landaus make for a striking display as long as the weather is fine, and they are used on occasions ranging from State Visits and the Opening of Parliament, to Royal Weddings, Jubilees and other celebrations. They also play a regular part in the welcoming of new ambassadors to the Court of St James's: soon after arriving in London, foreign ambassadors have an audience with the Queen in which they present their Letters of Credence or Letters of High Commission to Her Majesty. The ambassadors are collected from the embassy or residence by a State landau from the Royal Mews for this purpose, and escorted by the Marshal of the Diplomatic Corps, who is based at St. James's Palace. The ambassador's suite follows in another State landau.

Canada
The monarch of Canada has a state landau available in Ottawa for ceremonial processions from Rideau Hall to Parliament Hill. The State Landau was given to Canada in 1911 and was formerly used by the Governor General of Australia.

For the King's Plate in Toronto, the monarch and the royal family have a private landau owned by the Ontario Jockey Club and gift from E.P. Taylor.

Japan

A number of horse-drawn carriages, known in Japan as zagyoshiki, are maintained by the Imperial household and regularly used when new ambassadors present their credentials to the emperor as well as for royal weddings and coronations.

See also
 Barouche
 Steering undercarriage

References

Sources
Richardson, C., Driving : The Development and Use of Horse-Drawn Vehicles, London, 1985.
Berkebile, Don H: Carriage Terminology: A Historical Dictionary, Smithsonian Institution, Washington D.C., 1978.

Carriages
Animal-powered vehicles
History of road transport
Horse transportation